Meteorological Monographs is a peer-reviewed monograph series published by the American Meteorological Society. The series has two parts, historical and meteorological.

See also 
 List of scientific journals in earth and atmospheric sciences

External links 
 

Meteorology journals
English-language journals
Publications with year of establishment missing
American Meteorological Society academic journals
Monographic series
Irregular journals